Kirsi Eva Marika Valasti (born 12 November 1969) is a Finnish long-distance runner. She competed in the women's 5000 metres at the 2004 Summer Olympics.

References

1969 births
Living people
Athletes (track and field) at the 2004 Summer Olympics
Finnish female long-distance runners
Olympic athletes of Finland
Place of birth missing (living people)